The 1945 All-Ireland Senior Football Championship was the 59th staging of the All-Ireland Senior Football Championship, the Gaelic Athletic Association's premier inter-county Gaelic football tournament. It was played at venues all over Ireland from 29 April to 23 September 1945.

31 teams entered, with Kilkenny once again declining to field a team. Roscommon were the defending champions, however, they surrendered their title in their opening game, a Connacht semi-final defeat by Mayo.

The All-Ireland final was played on 23 September 1945 at Croke Park in Dublin, between Cork and Cavan, in what was their first ever meeting in a final. Cork won the match by 2-05 to 0-07 to claim their third championship title overall and a first title since 1911.

Results

Connacht Senior Football Championship

Quarter-final

Semi-finals

Final

Leinster Senior Football Championship

Preliminary round

     

Quarter-finals

Semi-finals

Final

Munster Senior Football Championship

Quarter-finals

Semi-finals

Final

Ulster Senior Football Championship

Preliminary round

Quarter-finals

Semi-finals

Final

All-Ireland Senior Football Championship

Semi-finals

Final

Championship statistics

Miscellaneous

 Limerick beat Clare for the only time between 1909 and 1980.
 Wexford win the Leinster final for the first time since 1925.
 The attendance of 44,526 at Cavan-Wexford game was a new record for an All-Ireland semi-final.
 Cork end their longest drought as All Ireland Champions with future Taoiseach, Jack Lynch among the team a 34 year wait at and end first since 1911.

References

All-Ireland Senior Football Championship